Wigandia is a genus of flowering plants within the waterleaf subfamily, Hydrophylloideae.  They are found mainly in Central America and South America, though one or two species are found as far north as the United States.  Some are grown as ornamental plants and will flourish in most Mediterranean or temperate regions. The genus is named for Johann Wigand (c. 1523–1587), German Lutheran cleric and theologian, and Bishop of Pomesania.

Within the Hydrophylloideae, Wigandia species are unusual in having minute seeds and a high base chromosome number (19); it is also the only neotropical genus in the subfamily.

Some species originally classified in Wigandia are now treated in other genera, e.g. Eriodictyon.  There is a group of closely related genera within the Hydrophylloideae subfamily, and it is likely that further taxonomic work will result in additional reclassifications.  A recent molecular phylogenetic analysis of the Hydrophylloideae included two Wigandia species (W. caracasana and W. urens), and confirmed that they lay within a clade that includes Eriodictyon, and also the genera Nama  and Turricula.

The genus as currently recognized comprises over 20 species, including the following:

Wigandia brevistyla Cornejo
Wigandia caracasana
Wigandia crispa
Wigandia darii
Wigandia disparaginoides
Wigandia ecuadorensis Cornejo
Wigandia ericodes
Wigandia herbacea
Wigandia imperialis
Wigandia kraussii
Wigandia kunthii
Wigandia lasiocarpa
Wigandia laxifolia
Wigandia leucocephala
Wigandia macrophylla
Wigandia peruviana
Wigandia pruritiva
Wigandia reflexa
Wigandia scorpioides
Wigandia seriphiodes
Wigandia urens
Wigandia vigieri
Wigandia wurdackiana

Species formerly classified within Wigandia include:
Eriodictyon californicum (formerly W. californica)

References

Hydrophylloideae
Boraginaceae genera